Lao Suea Kok is a district (amphoe) in the northern part of Ubon Ratchathani province, northeastern Thailand.

History
Lao Suea Kok was separated from Mueang Ubon Ratchathani district to create a minor district (king amphoe) on 30 April 1994.

On 15 May 2007, all 81 minor districts were upgraded to full districts. On 24 August the upgrade became official.

Geography
Neighboring districts are (from the north clockwise) Phana of Amnat Charoen province; Trakan Phuet Phon, Don Mot Daeng, Mueang Ubon Ratchathani and Muang Sam Sip of Ubon Ratchathani Province.

Administration
The district is divided into four sub-districts (tambons), which are further subdivided into 53 villages (mubans). There are no municipal (thesaban) areas, and three tambon administrative organizations (TAO).

References

External links
amphoe.com

Lao Suea Kok